The ATIV SE is a smartphone manufactured by Samsung which runs Windows Phone 8. It's an LTE device with a 5-inch 1080p AMOLED display, a 2.3 GHz quad-core CPU (presumably the Qualcomm Snapdragon 800), 2GB RAM, 16GB expandable storage memory, a pair of 13MP rear and 2MP front cameras with 1080p video recording, and a 2600mAh battery.  It includes some OEM apps in addition to the default Windows Phone apps such as Channel Surf for Smart TVs, Samsung Link for sharing content across devices, and ATIV Beam for sending files to Android devices.

References

Mobile phones introduced in 2014
Discontinued smartphones
Windows Phone devices
Mobile phones with user-replaceable battery